The Ministry of Education Mandarin Chinese Dictionary refers to official dictionaries of Mandarin Chinese, specifically Taiwanese Mandarin, issued and edited by the Ministry of Education (Taiwan). Officially issued online versions of the dictionary include the Concised Mandarin Chinese Dictionary and the Revised Mandarin Chinese Dictionary.

The Revised Mandarin Chinese Dictionary includes 156,710 entries. The Revised Mandarin Chinese Dictionary was published in 1994.

References

External links
 Concised Mandarin Chinese Dictionary 
 Revised Mandarin Chinese Dictionary 

Chinese dictionaries